Pure Hearts: Into Chinese Showbiz, often shortened to Pure Hearts, is a 2017 Chinese film directed and produced by Bi Zhifei. The plot focuses on a teacher at an acting school trying to make a movie with his students and the difficulties that result from the dark side of the film industry and their personal struggles during production. Due to its troubled production, which involved accusations of overworking and mistreatment by Bi and claims that it took 12 years to make, and heavy criticism of the film itself after release, it has been considered one of the worst Chinese films ever made. In response, Bi accused Douban of discrimination against domestic films and even submitted the film to the Cannes Film Festival.

References

External links
 
 
 

2017 films
Chinese drama films
2010s Mandarin-language films